Vālmiki is a crater on Mercury.  Its name was adopted by the International Astronomical Union (IAU) in 1976. It is named for the Indian poet Valmiki.

Vālmiki is one of 110 peak ring basins on Mercury.

Vālmiki is located between the ancient, large craters Tolstoj (to the west) and Beethoven (to the east).  To the southwest is Gogol, and to the southeast is Bartók.

References

Impact craters on Mercury